The 1855 Massachusetts gubernatorial election was held on November 6. Know-Nothing candidate Henry J. Gardner was re-elected to a second term as Governor in a multi-partisan race, defeating Republican Julius Rockwell and Democrat Erasmus Beach.

This was the first election won by a direct plurality vote, after the majority requirement was abolished by the legislature on May 23. Gardner won without ratification by the General Court.

General election

Candidates
 Erasmus Beach, former State Senator from Springfield (Democratic)
 Henry J. Gardner, incumbent Governor (Native American)
 Julius Rockwell, interim U.S. Senator (1854–55) (Republican)
 Samuel H. Walley, U.S. Representative from Roxbury (Whig)

Results

See also
 1855 Massachusetts legislature

References

Governor
1855
Massachusetts
November 1855 events